The men's 50 metre freestyle S7 event at the 2022 Commonwealth Games was held on 1 August at the Sandwell Aquatics Centre.

Results

Final

References

Men's 50 metre freestyle S7